Rev or Rév may refer to:

Abbreviations

Rev.
 Rev., an abbreviation for revolution, as in Revolutions per minute
 Rev., an abbreviation for the religious style The Reverend
 Rev., the abbreviation for Runtime Revolution, a development environment
 Rev., an abbreviation for the Book of Revelation
 Rev., an abbreviation for Reverse
 Rev., an abbreviation for Revision
 Rev., an abbreviation for Revolver
 Rev., an abbreviation for Review, as in:
 Chem. Rev. (Chemical Reviews), a peer-reviewed scientific journal
 Phys. Rev. (Physical Review), an American scientific journal

Revs
 Revs (video game), a 1984 Formula Three simulation computer game
 Revs (graffiti artist), tag name of a graffiti artist in New York City
 The Revs, an Irish rock band
 Revs, the nickname for the New England Revolution soccer club in America

Acronyms
 REV Bremerhaven, a professional hockey team in Germany's 2nd Bundesliga league
 REV (Conference), the International Conference on Remote Engineering and Virtual Instrumentation
 Iomega REV, a removable disk storage system
 Range-extended vehicle
 Redlands East Valley High School
 Regulator of Virion, a protein of HIV
 Representative elementary volume
 Revised English Version, an Internet Bible version by Spirit & Truth Fellowship International 2012
 Réseau Express Vélo, a network of bicycle lanes in Montreal
 Robotic Enhanced Vehicles (R.E.V.), a toy sold by WowWee

Companies
 Rev (company), a speech-to-text and captioning company
 Revlon, an American multinational cosmetics, skin care, fragrance, and personal care company
 REV Group, an American manufacturer of specialty vehicles
 D-Rev, a non-profit product development company

Music
 Rev-Ola Records, a UK record label formed in 1988
 Rev (Perry Farrell album), 1999
 Rev (Ten Foot Pole album), 1994
 Rev (Ultra Vivid Scene album), 1992
 Rev (The Reverend Horton Heat album), 2014

People
 Rev I of Iberia (died 216), king of (Caucasian) Iberia (i.e., eastern Georgia)
 Rev II of Iberia (4th century), a prince who functioned as a co-king to his father Mirian III, the first Christian Georgian ruler
 Rev Cannady (1904–1981), baseball player in the Negro leagues
 Lívia Rév (1916–2018), classical concert pianist
 Martin Rev (born 1947), instrumentalist from New York punk-era electronic band Suicide
 The Rev (James Owen Sullivan, 1981–2009), drummer for the band Avenged Sevenfold
 Joseph Simmons, better known as Rev Run, of Run-DMC

Other uses
 Rev (comics), a Marvel Comics supervillain
 Rev (drink), an alcopop
 Rev (HIV), an HIV gene
 Rev. (TV series), a BBC sitcom (2010–2014) about an inner-city priest
 Rev Bem, a fictional character in the television series Gene Roddenberry's Andromeda
 Rev limiter, a device attached to an internal combustion engine 
 Rev, a type of semantic link
 Rév, the Hungarian name for Vadu Crișului Commune, Bihor County, Romania
 REV, the product code used by Nintendo for Wii hardware and software, a reference to the platform's prototype name of Revolution
 G.rev, a Japanese arcade videogame developer
 Horns Rev, a shallow area in the eastern North Sea
 Şəlvə, Khojali, or Rev, a village in the Republic of Artsakh de facto (Azerbaijan de jure)

See also

 Rav, an honorific title
 
 Reverse (disambiguation)
 Reverend (disambiguation)
 Revolution (disambiguation)
 Revolve (disambiguation)